Knottingley Park is a cricket ground in Waimate, Canterbury, New Zealand.  The first recorded match held on the ground came in 1902 when South Canterbury played North Otago.  The ground later held a single List A match in the 1984/85 Shell Cup when Canterbury played Central Districts, which resulted in a 6 wicket victory for Central Districts.

References

External links
Knottingley Park at ESPNcricinfo
Knottingley Park at CricketArchive

Cricket grounds in New Zealand
Sports venues in Canterbury, New Zealand
Waimate